Schinia cupes is a moth of the family Noctuidae. It is found from Texas, west to New Mexico and north to Kansas and Colorado.

The wingspan is about 30 mm. Adults are on wing from March to June. There is a second smaller generation flying from late-July to September.

The larvae feed on Camissonia claviformis and Castilleja exserta.

External links
Images
Systematics of Schinia cupes (Grote) complex: Revised status of Schinia crotchii (Hy. Edwards) (Lepidoptera: Noctuidae: Heliothinae)

Schinia
Moths of North America
Moths described in 1875

Taxa named by Augustus Radcliffe Grote